Ilija Šoškić (Cyrillic: Илија Шошкић; born 1935) is Montenegrin-Yugoslavian-Italian visual artist and art theorist. He was one of the pioneers of the new art forms in Yugoslavia in the 1960s. His art belongs to the conceptual tradition and covers performance art, video and installation art. Before turning to art, Šoškić was an athlete. He is the Montenegro record holder in hammer throw set in 1962.

Biography
Ilija Šoškić was born in 1935 in Dečani, Kingdom of Yugoslavia and was raised in Montenegro. He graduated from the High School of Art in Herceg Novi. Before turning to art, Šoškić was an athlete. He is the Montenegro record holder in hammer throw with 57.89m throw set on 25 June 1962. He studied at the Academy of Fine Arts in Belgrade (capital of Yugoslavia), where he took part in the 1968 student demonstrations. Because of this and his radical leftist ideas, Šoškić was in conflict with the Yugoslavian communist authorities, so he left Yugoslavia in 1969 and settled in Bologna, Italy. In 1972, he moved to Rome where he has lived ever since.

References

Sources

People from Deçan
Montenegrin artists
1935 births
Yugoslav artists
Performance artists
Installation artists
Video artists
Yugoslav male hammer throwers
Living people